Masquerader, Masqueraders, The Masquerader or The Masqueraders may refer to:

 The Masquerader (novel), a 1904 novel by Katherine Cecil Thurston
 The Masqueraders, a 1928 novel by Georgette Heyer
 The Masqueraders, an 1894 English play by Henry Arthur Jones
 The Masquerader (play), a 1917 play by John Hunter Booth, based on Thurston's novel
 The Masquerader (1914 film), an American silent film by Charlie Chaplin
 The Masqueraders (film), a 1915 American adaptation of Jones' play
 The Masquerader (1922 film), an American adaptation of Booth's play
 The Masquerader (1933 film), an American adaptation of Booth's play starring Ronald Colman
 Masqueraders, the performers in West Country Carnivals

See also
 Labrisomus conditus, the Masquerader hairy blenny, a fish
 Masquerade (disambiguation)